Zeitz is a German surname. Notable people with the surname include:

Christian Zeitz (born 1980), German handball player
Jochen Zeitz (born 1963), German businessman
Joshua M. Zeitz (born 1974), American historian, writer and politician
Luise Zietz, German socialist and feminist
Manuel Zeitz (born 1990), German footballer
Paul Zeitz (born 1958), American mathematician

See also 
 Seitz (surname)

German-language surnames
German toponymic surnames